Liberty Pole is an unincorporated community in Vernon County, Wisconsin in the town of Franklin.

Notable people
T. Frank Clancy, businessman and politician, was born in Liberty Pole.

Notes

Unincorporated communities in Vernon County, Wisconsin
Unincorporated communities in Wisconsin